Stade Rochelais, commonly called La Rochelle, is a French rugby union club who compete in the Top 14.

They were founded in 1898 and play at Stade Marcel-Deflandre (capacity 16,000). They wear yellow and black. They are based in La Rochelle in the Charente-Maritime département of the Nouvelle-Aquitaine region.

98% of the shares are owned by the Stade Rochelais Association.

Stadium 

The stadium is named after Marcel Deflandre, who was the president of the club born of the fusion between the rugby league and rugby union clubs during World War II in La Rochelle, after the Vichy government banned the game of Rugby League and forced all of its assets to be handed to the French Rugby Union.

Honours 
 Top 14
 Runners-up: 2020–21
 European Rugby Champions Cup
 Champions: 2021–22
 Runners-up: 2020–21
 EPCR Challenge Cup
 Runners-up: 2018–19
 Challenge Yves du Manoir
 Champions: 2002, 2003 (March)

Current standings

Current squad 

The La Rochelle squad for the 2022–23 season is:

Espoirs squad

The Stade Rochelais Espoirs squad is:

France results

Top 14 Championship Final

European results

European Rugby Champions Cup Final

Notable former players 

 Facundo Bosch
 Ramiro Herrera
 Germán Llanes
 Federico Todeschini
 Zack Holmes
 Brock James
 Ryan Lamb
 Lopeti Timani
 Julien Berger
 Jason Marshall
 Lesley Vainikolo
 Sireli Bobo
 Eneriko Buliruarua
 Norman Ligairi
 Kini Murimurivalu
 Jone Qovu
 Seru Rabeni
 Alipate Ratini
 Savenaca Rawaca
 Albert Vulivuli
 Marc Andreu
 Julien Audy
 Alexi Balès
 Jean-Pascal Barraque
 Steeve Barry
 Pierre Bérard
 Mohamed Boughanmi
 Benoît Bourrust
 Damien Cler
 Thomas Combezou
 Manoël Dall'igna
 Benjamin Dambielle
 Vincent Debaty
 William Demotte
 Geoffrey Doumayrou
 Luc Ducalcon
 Arnaud Élissalde
 Jean-Baptiste Élissalde
 Jean-Pierre Élissalde
 Sébastien Fauqué
 Lionel Faure
 Romain Frou
 Loann Goujon
 Jean-Philippe Grandclaude
 Gabriel Lacroix
 Damien Lagrange
 Grégory Lamboley
 Benjamin Lapeyre
 Benoit Lecouls
 Henri Magois
 Gérald Merceron
 Jean Pambrun
 Vincent Pelo
 Julien Pierre
 Jules Plisson
 Dany Priso
 Vincent Rattez
 Arthur Retière
 David Roumieu
 Christophe Samson
 Laurent Simutoga
 Jérémy Sinzelle
 Rémi Talès
 Jean-Teiva Jacquelain
 Gagi Bazadze
 Guram Papidze
 Robert Mohr
 Gonzalo Canale
 Pietro Ceccarelli
 Leandro Cedaro
 Jason Eaton
 Hamish Gard
 Romana Graham
 David Raikuna
 Rene Ranger
 Victor Vito
 Ihaia West
 Petrișor Toderașc
 Alofa Alofa
 Piula Faʻasalele
 Tamato Leupolu
 Ricky Januarie
 Paul Jordaan

Arnaud, then his son Jean-Pierre and his grandson Jean-Baptiste all played for La Rochelle as scrum-halves.

Coaches 
Well known former coaches include 
 Arnaud Élissalde
 Jean-Pierre Élissalde

The club only had three head coaches from 1992-2017, including Patrice Collaco since 2011.

Leadership and management
Vincent Marling, president as of 2017, had guided the club for 25 years. He was the driving force behind the “Grow Together” campaign launched in 2015 that persuaded 500 local businesses to support/sponsor the club.

See also 
 List of rugby union clubs in France
 Rugby union in France

References

External links 
  Stade Rochelais Official website

 
La Rochelle
Rugby clubs established in 1898
Sport in La Rochelle